The  is a tram line serving the island of Shikoku, Japan, in the city of Kōchi, Kōchi Prefecture. This tram line is part of the Tosaden Kōtsū network. Most tramcars directly continue to Ino Line.

Stations

Rail transport in Kōchi Prefecture